Deflex, also known as Super Deflex, Deflex V, and Made In France, is an arcade puzzle game developed by Jeff Minter. The first version, developed in 1981 for the VIC-20 and Commodore PET, is the first Llamasoft game ever produced.

Gameplay
The gameplay in all versions follows the same basic mechanic.  A ball bounces around the screen, moving in cardinal directions only and bouncing off at 180 degrees when it strikes the side of the screen.  By pressing a key (or moving the joystick or touching the touchscreen), the player can cause a paddle to appear at the ball's current location, making the ball immediately bounce off the paddle and turn either left or right.  Once placed, a paddle remains on screen, forcing the ball into more and more complex bouncing patterns.  In addition, whenever the ball strikes a paddle, the paddle's direction is reversed.  The objective of the game is to guide the ball to touch a randomly placed target that appears on screen.  When the target is touched, score is awarded and a new target is placed, although all existing paddles remain.  The player loses the game if a target is not touched within a time limit.

Versions
The original PET/VIC-20/ZX81 version displayed one target at a time and had only a single level which ran forever.  The game was played entirely for score. 

A Commodore 64 version of Deflex called Made In France (because the programmer was actually in France at the time he programmed that part of the game) was posted as a free download to the Compunet service.  The gameplay was the same as the original version.  This was also included as an easter egg in the game Iridis Alpha, where it identified itself only as "MIF BY YAK".

A version for the Pocket PC platform - again called only Deflex - was later released and ported to Windows.  This version had a more modern structure in which the game was divided into levels with each level having a pre-determined layout of multiple targets and sometimes pre-placed walls.  The player was required to collect all targets on the level within the time limit, but had multiple lives which allowed them to try again from the same level.  This version also introduced hazardous objects which instantly cost the player a life if the ball touches them, with the message "You clumsy donkey!"

The most recently released version is for iOS, and runs on both the iPhone and iPad platforms with similar features. This follows the same level-based structure as the PC version, but the time limit returns to being between collection of individual targets rather than for the whole level, and touching a hazardous object deducts an amount of time rather than instantly losing the level.  Placing paddles also deducts a small amount of time.  Lives are removed, because this version allows any previously reached level to be played on demand.  This version also added a "combo" system whereby the ball may be precisely placed to touch multiple targets at the same time; doing this multiple times in series awards additional points.  This version also has a distinctive soundtrack composed of piano chords and arpeggios that trigger on events in the game, and commentary by a voice-over reminiscent of Fluttershy from My Little Pony.

References

1981 video games
Action video games
Commodore 64 games
Commodore PET games
IOS games
Llamasoft games
Video games developed in the United Kingdom
Windows games
Windows Mobile games
ZX81 games
ZX Spectrum games